Khamerernebty  (“The Beloved of the Two Ladies Appears”; “two ladies”, referring to the protective goddesses of Upper and Lower Egypt, was a title of the pharaoh) was an ancient Egyptian name, worn by two queens and a princess during the Old Kingdom:

 Khamerernebty I of the 4th dynasty was the wife of Pharaoh Khafra and the mother of Menkaura.
 Khamerernebty II, possible daughter of the former, was the wife of Menkaura.
 Princess Khamerernebty was the only known child of Pharaoh Niuserre of the 5th dynasty. She was married to the vizier Ptahshepses.

Ancient Egyptian given names